Stephen Clarke-Willson is a computer scientist who was a video game producer and executive producer in the early 1990s who produced a number of hit games.

Summary
From 1990 to 1994, he was the vice-president of Virgin Interactive. He was instrumental in Virgin's acquisition of Westwood Studios, after which he supervised budgets at Westwood.

He supervised the production of titles for the SNES and the Sega Genesis like Disney's Aladdin, Global Gladiators, Cool Spot, and Disney’s Jungle Book; also The Seventh Guest for DOS.  (He was also the producer of one of the most ridiculed games of all time, Color a Dinosaur.)

He published a SIGGRAPH paper, "Applying Game Design to Virtual Environments".

Clarke-Willson now works at ArenaNet as the Studio Technical Director for Guild Wars.

Trivia
Clarke-Willson arranged and performed "The Bare Necessities Rag" title music for Disney’s Jungle Book on Genesis and SNES.
He composed the Adrenium Games theme which was arranged by Larry Kenton and performed by the musicians of the City of Prague Philharmonic and first heard in the video game Azurik: Rise of Perathia.
Created the NES game Color a Dinosaur for his four-year-old son. It cost $30,000 to produce, was printed on the cheapest cartridges Nintendo offered, and was sold (he thinks) exclusively at Wal-Mart.

References

External links
 Interview from Sega-16.com

American video game designers
American video game producers
Living people
Virgin Group people
Year of birth missing (living people)